The banking industry in France has, as of 11 October 2008, an average leverage ratio (assets/net worth) of 28 to 1, and its short-term liabilities are equal to 60% of the French GDP or 128% of its national debt.

France operates a deposits guarantee fund, known as the Fonds de Garantie des Depôts.

During 2018 the banking sector of the French economy employed 362,800 people.

Largest banks
The largest banks by total assets in Euro (as of Year end 2020) in France are the following:

1. BNP Paribas:             $2,488.5 Bn

2. Crédit Agricole:        $1,961.1 Bn

3. Société Générale:       $1,462.0 Bn

4. BPCE:                         $863.3 Bn

5. Crédit Mutuel - CIC:    $624.0 Bn

History of banking
At about the time of the commencement of the year 1800, and of the first period of revolutionary change in banking within the continent of Europe, the high banking houses of France included the  Hottinguer, Mallet (fr),  Neuflize (fr), Rothschilds and Vernes (fr).

Online banking in France
Monabanq (fr), opened during 2006, based in Hauts-de-France.

References

Source
La Fédération Bancaire Française  (the Banking Federation of France)

Further reading
 Born, Karl Erich. International Banking in the 19th and 20th Centuries (St Martin's, 1983) online

External links
Information about French banks in English
Liste des néobanques pro et banques en ligne pour professionnels en France (French language)
Alain Plessis (fr) - Histoire des banques en France (French language) La Fédération Bancaire Française and  l’Université de Paris X Nanterre
Véronique Chocron (9 May 2019) - Alors que la Société générale a perdu plus d’un million de clients en six ans, sa filiale Boursorama vise plus de 3 millions de comptes en 2021 le Monde